Erfan Ahangarian is an Iranian wushu athlete.  He won the gold medal at the 2018 Asian Games in Jakarta, Indonesia. He won gold medal at the 2019 World Wushu Championships in Shanghai in the men's Sanda 60 kg category.

Achievements 
  Medal at World championships 2019 Shanghai, 65kg.
  Medal at World cup 2016 Xian, 65kg
  Medal at World universiade games 2017 Taiwan, 60kg
  Medal at Islamic solidarity games 2017 Baku, 60 kg
  Medal atAsian games 2018 Jakarta, 60kg
  Medal at Asian championships 2016 Taiwan, 60kg
  Medal at world junior championships 2014 Antalia, 56kg
  Medal at Pars Cup International Tournament 2015 Tehran, 60Kg
  Medal at Pars Cup International Tournament 2018 Semnan, 60kg

References

External links 
 Erfan Ahangarian on WUSHU FEDERATION OF I.R.IRAN

Asian Games medalists in wushu
Asian Games gold medalists for Iran
Wushu practitioners at the 2018 Asian Games
Medalists at the 2018 Asian Games
Iranian wushu practitioners
Sportspeople from Isfahan
1996 births
Living people
Medalists at the 2017 Summer Universiade
Universiade gold medalists for Iran
Islamic Solidarity Games competitors for Iran